Daniel Nevil Mina Arisola (born December 9, 1980) is an Ecuadorian football midfielder currently playing for Barcelona.

External links
FEF Player Card

1980 births
Living people
People from Manabí Province
Association football midfielders
Ecuadorian footballers
Ecuadorian Serie A players
Barcelona S.C. footballers
C.D. Olmedo footballers
C.S.D. Macará footballers
C.D. Cuenca footballers
C.D. Técnico Universitario footballers
S.D. Quito footballers